Santiago Nicolas Paz (born 6 October 1996) is an Argentine footballer who plays as a midfielder.

References

External links

1996 births
Living people
Argentine footballers
Argentine expatriate footballers
Association football midfielders
Atlético de Rafaela footballers
Club Sportivo Ben Hur players
Club Atlético San Miguel footballers
Argentine Primera División players
Torneo Argentino B players
People from Rafaela
Sportspeople from Santa Fe Province
Argentine expatriate sportspeople in the Dominican Republic
Expatriate footballers in the Dominican Republic